Paik is an American rock music group.

Paik may also refer to:

Baek, a Korean surname often spelled Paek, Baik, or Paik in Latin script
Paik (soldier), a type of infantry in medieval India
the Paik system of labour in medieval Assam
 PAIK, the ICAO code for Bob Baker Memorial Airport